12/1 may refer to:

December 1 (month-day date notation)
January 12 (day-month date notation)
January 12 AD (month-year date notation)
1 AD December (year-month date notation)

See also

121 (disambiguation)
1/12 (disambiguation)
112 (disambiguation)
12 (disambiguation)
1 (disambiguation)